The following are the national records in Olympic weightlifting in Bahrain. Records are maintained in each weight class for the snatch lift, clean and jerk lift, and the total for both lifts by the Bahrain Weightlifting Federation.

Men

Women

References

Bahrain
Olympic weightlifting
Records